The Paul McCartney World Tour was a worldwide concert tour by Paul McCartney, notable for being McCartney's first tour under his own name, and for the monumental painted stage sets by artist Brian Clarke. The 103-gig tour, which ran from 1989 through 1990, included a concert played to what was then the largest stadium crowd in the history of rock and roll.

Tour 
The World Tour was Paul McCartney's first world tour under his own name; it was also his first major tour outing in ten years, following the Wings UK Tour 1979, and his first world tour since the 1976 Wings Over the World Tour (both also with Linda McCartney).

While the tour coincided with the release of the solo album Flowers in the Dirt, and promoted that record by inclusion of its songs in the set list, The Paul McCartney World Tour has been characterised as thematically more about him embracing his Beatles past; for the first time in any of his solo tours, a substantial number of Beatles songs were featured in the set list. 

The tour was documented by the 1990 live albums Tripping the Live Fantastic and Tripping the Live Fantastic: Highlights!, and the 1991 concert film Get Back. A one-hour tour documentary was also aired on Channel 4 in the UK, titled From Rio to Liverpool.

Set designs 
The sets for the tour were designed by regular McCartney collaborator, the artist Brian Clarke, who together with Linda McCartney created the album cover for Flowers in the Dirt. The hand-painted stage set backdrops, notable for their scale, were executed under Clarke’s supervision by the scenic painters Elms Lesters, at the Los Angeles Painting Rooms. The scale designs for the tour, individual artworks by Clarke in acrylic and paper collage on Velin, were first publicly exhibited in 1990, at the Mayor Gallery in London. Elements from the sets appear as the graphic basis of much of the promotional material.

Tour booklet 
Concert attendees received, free of additional charge, a lavish 9x12-inch 98-me page booklet, containing the tour itinerary, lengthy profiles of the band members, descriptions of the tour's stage and logistics, and an extended description of Friends of the Earth's mission. Two-thirds of the booklet consisted of McCartney's reflections upon his life and career, illustrated by many photographs.

Set list 
The following set list is obtained from the September 28, 1989 concert in Scandinavium, Gothenburg. It is not intended to represent all dates throughout the tour.

 "Figure of Eight"
 "Jet"
 "Rough Ride"
 "Got to Get You into My Life"
 "Band on the Run"
 "Ebony and Ivory"
 "We Got Married"
 "Maybe I'm Amazed"
 "The Long and Winding Road"
 "The Fool on the Hill"
 "Sgt. Pepper's Lonely Hearts Club Band"
 "Good Day Sunshine"
 "Can't Buy Me Love"
 "Put It There"
 "Things We Said Today"
 "Eleanor Rigby"
 "This One"
 "My Brave Face"
 "Back in the U.S.S.R."
 "I Saw Her Standing There"
 "Twenty Flight Rock"
 "Coming Up"
 "Let It Be"
 "Ain't That a Shame"
 "Live and Let Die"
 "Hey Jude"
Encore
 "Yesterday"
 "Get Back"
 "Golden Slumbers"
"Carry That Weight"
"The End"

Tour dates

Box office score data

Personnel

Paul McCartney – lead vocals, guitars (acoustic, electric and bass), keyboards
Linda McCartney – backing vocals, keyboards, percussion
Hamish Stuart – backing vocals, guitars (acoustic, electric and bass)
Robbie McIntosh – backing vocals, electric guitar
Paul "Wix" Wickens – backing vocals, keyboards
Chris Whitten – drums, percussion

See also
List of highest-attended concerts

References

Paul McCartney concert tours
1989 concert tours
1990 concert tours